Colubraria obscura is a species of sea snail, a marine gastropod mollusk in the family Colubrariidae.

Description
The size of the shell varies between 25 mm and 60 mm.

Distribution
This marine species has a wide distribution: Florida, USA, to Brazil; off Canary Islands, Cape Verdes, Angola, Mozambique; in the Mediterranean Sea; in the Red Sea; in the Western Indian Ocean.

References

 Marais J.P. & Kilburn R.N. (2010) Colubrariidae. pp. 54–59, in: Marais A.P. & Seccombe A.D. (eds), Identification guide to the seashells of South Africa. Volume 1. Groenkloof: Centre for Molluscan Studies. 376 pp.

External links
 

Colubrariidae
Gastropods described in 1844
Molluscs of the Atlantic Ocean
Molluscs of the Indian Ocean
Molluscs of the Mediterranean Sea